This is a list of Googie architecture structures in Canada which includes a photographic gallery with a brief description of some of the structures which still remain. Googie was an original architectural style which began in Southern California during the late 1940s. Influenced by the coming of the Space Age, the Googie-themed architecture popularity was most notable during the mid-1960s, among motels, coffee houses and gas stations. The term "Googie" comes from a now defunct coffee shop and cafe built in West Hollywood designed by John Lautner.

List

The following are images of some of the Googie architecture structures remaining in Canada.

See also

List of Googie architecture structures (United States)
Googie architecture
Modern architecture

References

Further reading
Googie: Fifties Coffee Shop Architecture; by: Alan Hess; Publisher: Chronicle Books;  .
Googie Redux: Ultramodern Roadside Architecture; by: Alan Hess; Publisher: Chronicle Books;  .

structures
Googie architecture structures
Googie architecture structures